Silence in Dreamland is a 2013 Ecuador drama film directed by Tito Molina. It was selected as the Ecuadorian entry for the Best Foreign Language Film at the 87th Academy Awards, but was not nominated.

Cast
 Bertha Naranjo
 Ney Moreira
 Martín Rodríguez
 Yeliber Mero

See also
 List of submissions to the 87th Academy Awards for Best Foreign Language Film
 List of Ecuadorian submissions for the Academy Award for Best Foreign Language Film

References

External links
 

2013 films
2013 drama films
2010s Spanish-language films
Ecuadorian drama films